Mohamed Koné may refer to:

 Mohamed Koné (footballer, born 1984), Ivorian footballer
 Mohamed Kone (footballer, born 1993), Ivorian-born Burkinabé football player
 Mohamed Koné (basketball) (born 1981), Ivorian–French basketball player